Active radar homing (ARH) is a missile guidance method in which a missile contains a radar transceiver (in contrast to semi-active radar homing, which uses only a receiver) and the electronics necessary for it to find and track its target autonomously. The NATO brevity code for an air-to-air active radar homing missile launch is fox three.

Advantages
There are two major advantages to active radar homing:

 As the missile is tracking the target it is going to be much closer to the target than the launching platform during the terminal phase, thus the missile's tracking can be much more accurate and better resistant to electronic countermeasures. Active radar homing missiles have some of the best kill probabilities, along with missiles employing track-via-missile guidance.
 Because the missile is totally autonomous during the terminal phase, the launch platform does not need to have its radar enabled at all during this phase, and in the case of a mobile launching platform like an aircraft, can actually exit the scene or undertake other actions while the missile homes in on its target. This is often referred to as fire-and-forget capability and is a significant advantage that modern air-to-air missiles have over their predecessors.

Disadvantages
 Because most missiles are powered by rocket motors, they have no on-board electricity generation capability. This means that active radar-guided missiles usually rely on battery power for the radar transmitter, significantly limiting its power - although this can be mitigated by employing the designs described below.
 Because a complete radar system is implemented, an active system will be more expensive than a semi-active system if all other factors are equal.

Passive radiation homing
Many missiles employing passive homing have an additional capability: if the target does attempt to use noise jamming, the missile can home in on the target's radiation passively (home-on-jam). This gives such missiles improved performance against noise jamming targets and allows anti-aircraft munitions to attack targets they would not otherwise be able to fire on effectively..

Operation
Active radar homing is rarely employed as the only guidance method of a missile. It is most often used during the terminal phase of the engagement, mainly because since the radar transceiver has to be small enough to fit inside a missile and has to be powered from batteries, therefore having a relatively low ERP, its range is limited. To overcome this, most such missiles use a combination of command guidance with an inertial navigation system (INS) in order to fly from the launch point until the target is close enough to be detected and tracked by the missile. The missile therefore requires guidance updates via a datalink from the launching platform up until this point, in case the target is maneuvering, otherwise the missile may get to the projected interception point and find that the target is not there. Sometimes the launching platform (especially if it is an aircraft) may be in danger while continuing to guide the missile in this way until it 'goes active'; In this case it may turn around and leave it to luck that the target ends up in the projected "acquisition basket" when the missile goes active. It is possible for a system other than the launching platform to provide guidance to the missile before it switches its radar on; This may be other, similar fighter aircraft or perhaps an AWACS.

Most anti-ship missiles use active radar homing for terminal guidance.

Many ARH missiles with targets on land or sea use millimeter wave guidance.

List of missiles
Examples of missiles known to use active radar homing (all in their terminal phase) include:

China
 DF-21
 DF-25
 DF-26
 HN-2000
 PL-12 air-to-air missile and SD-10 (export version to Pakistan)
 PL-15 air-to-air missile
 HQ-9 air defense missile

European
 Meteor (missile) long-range air-to-air missile (With contribution from France, Germany, Italy, Spain, Sweden and United Kingdom)
 MBDA Future Cruise/Anti-Ship Weapon (France, UK)
 CAMM (missile family)
 Aster (missile family)

France
 MBDA Exocet anti-ship missile
 MICA (missile) air-to-air missile and surface-to-air missile

Germany
 EADS AS.34 Kormoran anti-ship missile

India
 Astra BVRAAM

Iran
 Noor/Ghader Anti-ship missile
 Taer 2 Surface-to-air missile

Israel
Arrow (Israeli missile)
David's Sling
Derby (missile)
Python (missile)

Japan
Type 80 Air-to-Ship Missile
Type 81 Surface-to-air Missile (SAM-1C only)
Type 88 Surface-to-Ship Missile
Type 90 Ship-to-Ship Missile
Type 91 Air-to-Ship Missile
Type 99 air-to-air missile (Mitsubishi AAM-4, AAM-4Kai)
Type 03 Medium-Range Surface-to-Air Missile
Type 11 Surface-to-air Missile

Russia
 NPO Novator and DRDO R-172 long range air-to-air missile
 Vympel NPO R-27 (AA-10 Alamo) medium range air-to-air missile (R-27EA variant only)
 Vympel NPO R-37 (AA-13 Arrow) long range air-to-air missile
 Vympel NPO R-33 (AA-9 Amos) long range air-to-air missile
 Vympel NPO R-77 (AA-12 Adder) medium range air-to-air missile
 Tactical Missiles Corporation Kh-31 (AS-17 Krypton) anti-shipping missile (Kh-31A only)
 Raduga Kh-15 (AS-16 Kickback) air-to-surface missile (Kh-15S only)
 Raduga Kh-59 (AS-13 Kingbolt) air-to-surface missile (Kh-59MK only)
 Tactical Missiles Corporation Kh-25 (AS-10 Karen) air-to-surface missile (Kh-25MA only)
 Raduga KSR-5 (AS-6 Kingfish) anti-shipping missile
 Raduga KSR-2 (AS-5 Kelt) anti-shipping missile
 Raduga Kh-22 (AS-4 Kitchen) anti-shipping missile 
 KBM Khrizantema (AT-15 Springer) anti-tank missile (9M123-2 and 9M123F-2 variants only)
 NPO Mashinostroyeniya P-500 Bazalt (SS-N-12 Sandbox) anti-ship missile
 NPO Mashinostroyeniya P-700 Granit (SS-N-19 Shipwreck) anti-ship missile
 Raduga P-270 Moskit (SS-N-22 Sunburn) anti-ship missile
 Tactical Missiles Corporation Kh-35 (SS-N-25 Switchblade) anti-ship missile
 NPO Mashinostroyeniya P-800 Oniks (SS-N-26) anti-ship missile
 NPO Novator 3M-54 Klub (SS-N-27 Sizzler) anti-ship missile
 S-400 long range surface-to-air missile system (40N6E, 9M96E2, 9M96E and 9M96 missiles only)

South Africa
 R-Darter

Sweden
 Saab Bofors Dynamics RBS-15 anti-ship missile

Taiwan
 Sky Sword II air-to-air missile
 Hsiung Feng I
 Hsiung Feng II
 Hsiung Feng IIE
 Hsiung Feng III
 Sky Spear
 Wan Chien
 Yun Feng

United States
 Boeing Harpoon anti-ship missile
 Hughes Aircraft Company AIM-47 Falcon
 Lockheed Martin AGM-114L Hellfire Longbow air-to-surface missile
 Lockheed Martin MIM-104 Patriot surface-to-air missile (PAC-3 version only)
 Martin Marietta Pershing II (topographic radar version of DSMAC)
 Raytheon AIM-54 Phoenix long range air-to-air missile 
 Raytheon AIM-120 AMRAAM air-to-air missile and surface-to-air missile
 Raytheon GBU-53/B
 Raytheon RIM-174 Standard ERAM (Standard Missile 6) surface-to-air missile
 Raytheon AGM-88 HARM (E and G versions only)
 The U.S. Navy's Bat radar-guided glide bomb of World War II, world's earliest munition design known to use an active radar homing system.

References

Missile guidance

ja:電波ホーミング誘導#アクティブ方式